Rhododendron fulgens (猩红杜鹃) is a rhododendron species native to Bhutan, northeast India, Nepal, Sikkim, and southern Xizang in China, where it grows at altitudes of 3700–4500 meters. It is a shrub that grows to 1.5–4 m in height, with leathery leaves that are oblong-ovate to obovate, 6–11 by 4.5–7 cm in size. Flowers are red.

References
 "Rhododendron fulgens", J. D. Hooker, Rhododendr. Sikkim-Himalaya. 3: t. 25. 1851.

fulgens